Air India is the flag carrier airline of India, headquartered at New Delhi. It is owned by Talace Private Limited, a fully owned subsidiary of Tata Sons, after Air India Limited's former owner, the Government of India, completed the sale. Air India operates a fleet of Airbus and Boeing aircraft serving 102 domestic and international destinations. The airline has its hub at Indira Gandhi International Airport, New Delhi, alongside several focus cities across India. Air India is the largest international carrier out of India with an 18.6% market share. Over 60 international destinations are served by Air India across five continents. The airline became the 27th member of Star Alliance on 11 July 2014.

The airline was founded by J. R. D. Tata as Tata Airlines in 1932; Tata himself flew its first single-engine de Havilland Puss Moth, carrying air mail from Karachi's Drigh Road Aerodrome to Bombay's Juhu aerodrome and later continuing to Madras (currently Chennai). After World War II, it became a public limited company and was renamed as Air India. On 21 February 1960, it took delivery of its first Boeing 707 named Gauri Shankar and became the first Asian airline to induct a jet aircraft in its fleet. In 2000 and 2001, attempts were made to privatise Air India and from 2006 onwards, it suffered losses after its merger with Indian Airlines. Another privatisation attempt was launched in 2017, which concluded with ownership of the airline and associated properties reverting to Tata in 2022.

Air India also operates flights to domestic and Asian destinations through its subsidiary Air India Express. Air India's mascot is the Maharajah (Emperor) and the logo consists of a flying swan with the wheel of Konark inside it.

History

Early years (1932–1945)

As Tata Air Services

Air India had its origin as Tata Air Services later renamed to Tata Airlines founded by J. R. D. Tata of Tata Sons, an Indian aviator and business tycoon. In April 1932, Tata won a contract to carry mail for Imperial Airways and the aviation department of Tata Sons was formed with two single-engine de Havilland Puss Moths. On 15 October 1932, Tata flew a Puss Moth carrying air mail from Karachi to Bombay (currently Mumbai) and the aircraft continued to Madras (currently Chennai) piloted by Nevill Vintcent, a former Royal Air Force pilot and friend of Tata. The airline fleet consisted of a Puss Moth aircraft and a de Havilland Leopard Moth. Initial service included weekly airmail service between Karachi and Madras via Ahmedabad and Bombay.

As Tata Airlines
The airline launched its first domestic flight from Bombay to Trivandrum with a six-seater Miles Merlin. In 1938, it was re-christened as Tata Air Services and later as Tata Airlines. Colombo in Ceylon (now Sri Lanka) and Delhi were added to the destinations in 1938. During the Second World War, the airline helped the Royal Air Force with troop movements, shipping of supplies, rescue of refugees and maintenance of aircraft.

Post-independence (1947–2000)

As Air India

After World War II, regular commercial service was restored in India and Tata Airlines became a public limited company on 29 July 1946, under the name Air India. After Indian independence in 1947, 49% of the airline was acquired by the Government of India in 1948. On 8 June 1948, a Lockheed Constellation L-749A named Malabar Princess (registered VT-CQP) took off from Bombay bound for London Heathrow marking the airline's first international flight.

Nationalisation
In 1953, the Government of India passed the Air Corporations Act and purchased a majority stake in the carrier from Tata Sons though its founder J. R. D. Tata would continue as Chairman until 1977. The company was renamed as Air India International Limited and the domestic services were transferred to Indian Airlines as a part of a restructuring. From 1948 to 1950, the airline introduced services to Nairobi in Kenya and to major European destinations Rome, Paris and Düsseldorf. The airline took delivery of its first Lockheed Constellation L-1049 and inaugurated services to Bangkok, Hong Kong, Tokyo and Singapore.

All-jet fleet
On 21 February 1960, Air India International inducted its first Boeing 707-420, thereby becoming the first Asian airline to enter the Jet Age. The airline inaugurated services to New York on 14 May 1960. On 8 June 1962, the airline's name was officially truncated to Air India and on 11 June 1962, Air India became the world's first all-jet airline. In 1971, the airline took delivery of its first Boeing 747-200B named Emperor Ashoka (registered VT-EBD) and introduced a new Palace in the Sky livery and branding. In 1986, Air India took delivery of its first Airbus A310-300. In 1993, Air India took delivery of a Boeing 747-400 named Konark (registered VT-ESM) and operated the first non-stop flight between New York and Delhi.

Post-liberalisation (since 2000)

In 2000–01, attempts were made to re-privatize Air India. In 2000, Air India introduced services to Shanghai, China. On 23 May 2001, the Ministry of Civil Aviation charged Michael Mascarenhas, the then-managing director, with corruption. According to the ministry reports, the airline lost approximately  because of extra commissions that Mascarenhas sanctioned and he was later suspended from the airline. In May 2004, Air India launched a wholly owned low cost subsidiary called Air-India Express connecting cities in India with the Middle East and Southeast Asia. Until 2007, Air India mainly operated on international long-haul routes while Indian Airlines operated on domestic and international short-haul routes.

Indian Airlines merger
In 2007, Air India and Indian Airlines were merged under Air India Limited and the airline took delivery of its first Boeing 777 aircraft. The airline was invited to be a part of the Star Alliance in 2007.

In July 2009, State Bank of India was appointed to prepare a road map for the recovery of the airline. The carrier sold three Airbus A300 and one Boeing 747-300M in March 2009 for $18.75 million to finance the debt. A report by the Comptroller and Auditor General blamed the decision to buy 111 new aircraft and the ill-timed merger with Indian Airlines for the poor financial situation. In August 2011, the invitation to join Star Alliance was suspended as a result of its failure to meet the minimum standards for the membership. The government pumped  into Air India in March 2012.

On 1 March 2009, Air India made Frankfurt Airport its international hub for onward connections to the United States from India. However, the airline shut down the Frankfurt hub on 30 October 2010 because of high operating costs. In 2010, financially less lucrative routes were terminated and the airline planned to open a new hub for its international flights at Dubai. In 2012, a study commissioned by the Corporate Affairs Ministry recommended that Air India should be partly privatised. In May 2012, the carrier invited offers from banks to raise up $800 million via external commercial borrowing and bridge financing. In May 2012, the airline was fined $80,000 by the US Transportation Department for failing to post customer service and tarmac delay contingency plans on its website and adequately inform passengers about its optional fees.

In 2013, the then-Civil Aviation Minister Ajit Singh stated privatisation was the key to the airline's survival. However, the opposition led by the BJP and the CPI(M) slammed the government. In 2013, the Indian government planned to delay equity infusion of  that was slated to be infused into the airline slowly over a period of eight years. In January 2013, Air India cleared a part of its pending dues through funds raised by selling and leasing back the newly acquired Boeing 787 Dreamliners. In March 2013, the airline posted its first positive EBITDA after almost six years and 20% growth in its operating revenue since the previous financial year. Air India Limited split its engineering and cargo businesses into two separate subsidiaries, Air India Engineering Services Limited (AIESL) and Air India Transport Services Limited (AITSL) in 2013. In December 2013, the airline appointed veteran pilot SPS Puri as its head of operations. The appointment was criticised by the Air India pilots union as Puri allegedly has multiple violations to his name.

Star Alliance membership
Air India became the 27th member of the Star Alliance on 11 July 2014. In August 2015, it signed an agreement with Citibank and State Bank of India to raise $300 million in external commercial borrowing to meet working capital requirements. As of May 2017, Air India is the third largest carrier in India (after IndiGo and Jet Airways), with a market share of 13%, but with the largest international network.

AirAsia India acquisition 
In November 2022, Air India announced the acquisition of 100% shareholding in AirAsia India, turning it into a subsidiary of Air India.

Privatisation
On 28 June 2017, the Government of India approved the privatisation of Air India. A committee has been set up to start the process.
In March 2018, the Government issued an Expression of Interest (EOI) to sell 76% stake of Air India, along with low-cost airline Air India Express, and a 50% stake of AISATS, a ground handling joint venture with Singapore Airport Terminal Services (SATS).

Having failed on previous occasions to sell the airline, the Government decided to sell 100% share of the airline and started its preparation in late-2019. On 27 January 2020, Government released the Expression of Interest (EOI) to invite bidders.

In September 2021, government issued fresh tenders for selling the airlines, where Spice Jet's Ajay Singh-led consortium and Tata Sons shown interest in the bid. On 27 January 2022, the airline was officially handed over to Tata Group.

On 14 February 2022, after its re-privatization, the airline appointed İlker Aycı, former Chairman of Turkish Airlines from 2015 to 2022 as its new CEO and managing director. He was supposed to take the charge on or before 1 April 2022, but declined the offer in the backdrop of Swadeshi Jagaran Manch demanding Tata Sons to rethink its decision and the government to show sensitivity since the matter involved national security issues. The company declined immediate comment on the issue. Later, in March 2022, Natarajan Chandrasekaran, the chairman of Tata Sons was appointed as the chairman of the airline. Later in May 2022, Tata Sons appointed Campbell Wilson as Air India's CEO and MD.

Corporate affairs and identity

Headquarters

Air India Limited is headquartered at the Indian Airlines House, New Delhi. Air India moved its headquarters from Air India Building, Mumbai to Delhi in 2013. The former headquarters is a 23-storey tower on Marine Drive and was one of the targets of the 1993 Bombay bombings. Air India also maintains a corporate office on Lexington Avenue in Manhattan as well as numerous cargo offices worldwide.

Subsidiaries

Current

Air India Regional was established as Alliance Air, a wholly owned subsidiary of Indian Airlines on 1 April 1996 and started operations on 21 June 1996. It was renamed Air India Regional after the merger between Air India and Indian Airlines. Air India Express began operations on 29 April 2005 and was initially owned by Air India Charters. It operates flights from South India to the Middle East and Southeast Asia.

Defunct

Air India became the first Asian airline to operate freighters when Air India Cargo was set up in 1954 and started its freighter operations with a Douglas DC-3 aircraft. Air India Cargo ended freighter aircraft operations in early 2012.

Mascot

Air India's mascot is the Maharajah (high king). It was created by Bobby Kooka, the then-commercial director of Air India, and Umesh Rao, an artist with J. Walter Thompson Limited in 1946. Kooka stated that, "We call him a Maharajah for want of a better description. But his blood isn't blue. He may look like royalty, but he isn't royal". Air India adopted the Maharajah as its mascot in 1946. It was used in promoting it although initially designed only for the airline's memo-pads. The Maharajah was given a makeover in 2015 and the brand is represented by a younger version.

Logo and livery
Air India's colour scheme is red and white. The aircraft were painted in white with red palace style carvings on the outside of the windows and the airline's name written in red.
The name is written in Hindi on the port side fuselage and in English on the port side tail. On the starboard side fuselage, the name is written in English, and in Hindi on the starboard tail. The window scheme was designed in line with the slogan Your Palace in the Sky. The aircraft were earlier named after Indian kings and landmarks. In 1989, to supplement its Flying Palace livery, Air India introduced a new livery that included a metallic gold spinning wheel on a deep red-coloured tail and a Boeing 747, Rajendra Chola, was the first aircraft to be painted in the new colours.

The first logo of Air India was a centaur, a stylised version of Sagittarius shooting an arrow in a circle representing the wheel of Konark. The logo chosen by founder J. R. D. Tata was introduced in 1948 and represented the airline until 2007. On 22 May 2007, Air India and Indian Airlines unveiled their new livery consisting of a Flying Swan with the wheel of Konark placed inside it. The flying swan was morphed from the centaur logo and the chakra was derived from Indian's erstwhile logo. On 15 May 2007, Air India refreshed its livery, making the Rajasthani arches along the windows slightly smaller, extending a stylised line from the tail of the aircraft to the nose and painting the underbelly red. The new logo features on the tail and the engine covers with red and orange lines running parallel to each other from the front door to the rear door.

Art collection 
Air India built a collection of Indian art from 1956 to the mid-2000s. The collection comprises works of important Indian artists and photographers of the 1950s, 1960s, and 1970s, sculptures, wood carvings, glass paintings, a large collection of rare textiles, and more. Among the works are paintings by M. F. Husain and V. S. Gaitonde and sketches by Goan cartoonist Mario Miranda. Some of the company's first purchases helped launch the career of notable painter B. Prabha. The artwork was often sent to be hung in Air India booking offices around the world and used in menus and advertising material. Sometimes artists would be sent to paint murals in foreign offices or be given airplane tickets in exchange for art. In 1967, the company commissioned ashtrays from Salvador Dalí and gifted a few hundred of them to its first-class passengers. As payment, Dali asked for a baby elephant, which Air India flew from Bengaluru to Geneva, along with a mahout. In the late 2010s, a plan to form a museum from the collection was stalled by privatization plans. The artworks reside in a building in Nariman Point, Mumbai.

Destinations

As of December 2019, Air India was flying to a total of 102 destinations including 57 domestic destinations and 45 international destinations in 31 countries across five continents around the world. Its primary hub is located at Indira Gandhi International Airport, New Delhi, and it has a secondary hub at Chhatrapati Shivaji Maharaj International Airport, Mumbai.

Alliance
Air India became the 27th member of Star Alliance on 11 July 2014.

In February 2022, two weeks after its privatization, the airline signed an interline pact with AirAsia India, a low-cost airline owned by Tata Group, for domestic flights.

Codeshare agreements
Air India has codeshare agreements with the following airlines:

 Air Astana
 Air Austral
 Air Canada
 Air India Express 
 Air Seychelles
 Avianca
 Croatia Airlines
 EgyptAir
 Ethiopian Airlines
 EVA Air
 Fiji Airways
 Hong Kong Airlines
 LOT Polish Airlines
 Lufthansa
 Myanmar Airways International
 Royal Brunei Airlines
 Singapore Airlines
 SriLankan Airlines
 Swiss International Air Lines
 TAP Air Portugal
 Thai Airways International
 Turkish Airlines

Note that codeshare operations have been suspended due to the COVID-19 pandemic.

Fleet

Fleet information

In 1932, Air India started operations with a de Havilland Puss Moth. It inducted its first Boeing 707-420 named Gauri Shankar (registered VT-DJJ), thereby becoming the first Asian airline to induct a jet aircraft in its fleet and on 4 August 1993, Air India took the delivery of its first Boeing 747-400 named Konark (registered VT-ESM).
Apart from the Boeing aircraft, Air India also operates a wide range of Airbus aircraft. In 1989, Indian Airlines introduced the Airbus A320-200 aircraft, which Air India now uses to operate both domestic and international short haul flights. In 2005, Indian Airlines introduced smaller A319s, which are now used mainly on domestic and regional routes. After the merger in 2007, Air India inducted the biggest member of the A320 family, the A321, to operate mainly on international short haul and medium haul routes. At the same time, Air India leased Airbus A330s to operate on medium-long haul international routes. Currently Air India has many narrow body aircraft for domestic destinations like A320, A321 and A320 neo. Air India has also many wide body aircraft like Boeing 777-200LR, Boeing 777-300ER, Boeing 747-400 and Boeing 787-8 mainly for international destinations. Air India Express, a subsidiary of Air India has a fleet of 25 Boeing 737-800. On 17 June 2019, Air India grounded its last Airbus A320 classic fleet, which flown its last flight from Delhi to Mumbai.

Fleet restructuring
As a part of the financial restructuring, Air India sold five of its eight Boeing 777-200LR aircraft to Etihad Airways in December 2013. According to the airline, plans for introducing ultra-long flights with service to Seattle, San Francisco, and Los Angeles were cancelled due to factors like high fuel prices and weak demand. Air India flights to San Francisco have been resumed with more new international destinations. On 24 April 2014, Air India issued a tender for leasing 14 Airbus A320 aircraft for up to six years, to strengthen its domestic network.
Air India has purchased many Boeing 787-8 dreamliners to strengthen international operations.

On 14th February 2023, Air India announced an order for 470 aircraft with Airbus and Boeing. The order consists of 210 A320neo family aircraft, 40 A350, 190  737 MAX, 20 787-9 and 10 777-9 aircraft with deliveries beginning late 2023.

Services

Cabin
The Boeing 777-200LR/777-300ER aircraft operated on long haul flights are in a three-class configuration. Boeing 787 Dreamliner and Airbus A321 aircraft have a two-class configuration. Airbus A320 aircraft operated on domestic- and short haul international flights are in either an all-economy configuration or a two-class configuration. Airbus A319 aircraft have a full economy configuration. Air India serves meals on all international flights and on domestic flights with a flight duration of over 90 minutes.

In-flight entertainment
Air India aircraft are equipped with Thales i3000 in-flight entertainment system. Passengers can choose from five channels airing Hindi and English content. Air India's Boeing 777, 747 and 787 aircraft are also equipped with personal on demand in-flight entertainment systems on which passengers can choose from available content. Showtime is the official entertainment guide published by Air India. Shubh Yatra (meaning Happy Journey) is a bilingual in-flight magazine published in English and Hindi by Air India.

Frequent flyer programme
Flying Returns is Air India's frequent-flyer programme. It is shared by Air India and its subsidiaries. The points can be redeemed for awards travel on some other airlines.

Premium lounges
The Maharaja Lounge (English: Emperor's Lounge) is available for the use of First and Business class passengers. Air India shares lounges with other international airlines at international airports that do not have a Maharaja Lounge available. There are eight Maharaja Lounges:

India
 Chhatrapati Shivaji International Airport, Mumbai
 Indira Gandhi International Airport, Delhi
 Chennai International Airport, Chennai
 Kempegowda International Airport, Bangalore
 Rajiv Gandhi International Airport, Hyderabad
 Sardar Vallabhbhai Patel International Airport, Ahmedabad

International
 John F. Kennedy International Airport, New York City
 Heathrow Airport, London
 San Francisco International Airport, San Francisco

Missions

Gulf War evacuation
The airline entered the Guinness Book of World Records for the most people evacuated by civil airliner. The operation was carried out during Persian Gulf War to evacuate Indian expatriates from Kuwait and Iraq. The event was later featured in the film Airlift.

Accidents and incidents

 On 27 December 1947, a Douglas C-48C (registered VT-AUG) carrying nineteen passengers and four crew en route from Karachi to Bombay, crashed at Korangi Creek due to loss of control following instrument failure, killing all on board. This was the airline's first fatal accident. The aircraft had been notorious for electrical problems and had an unusual number of instrument replacements.
 On 3 November 1950, Air India Flight 245, a Lockheed L-749 Constellation (registered VT-CQP, Malabar Princess) carrying forty passengers and eight crew on a flight from Bombay to London via Cairo and Geneva, crashed on Mont Blanc in France, killing all on board. In 1966, Flight 101 crashed in nearly the exact same spot.
 On 13 December 1950, a Douglas C-47B (registered VT-CFK) carrying 17 passengers and four crew from Bombay to Coimbatore, crashed into high ground near Kotagiri due to a navigational error, killing all on board.
 On 15 September 1951, Douglas C-47A Dakota III VT-CCA lost control and crashed on takeoff from HAL Bangalore Airport with the autopilot turned on, killing a crew member; all 23 passengers survived.
 On 9 May 1953, Douglas C-47A VT-AUD crashed shortly after takeoff from Palam Airport following a loss of control due to pilot error, killing all thirteen passengers and five crew on board.
 On 11 April 1955, a bomb exploded in the right main landing gear bay of Lockheed L-749A Constellation VT-DEP Kashmir Princess, carrying eleven passengers and eight crew from Hong Kong to Jakarta. The right wing caught fire and the crew were forced to attempt a water landing. The wingtip dug into the water and the aircraft crashed, killing sixteen of the occupants.
 On 19 July 1959 Rani of Aera, a Lockheed L-1049G Super Constellation (registered VT-DIN) carrying 46 people (39 passengers and seven crew) crashed on approach to Santacruz Airport in conditions of poor visibility due to rain. The aircraft suffered damage beyond repair and was written off. There were no fatalities.

 On 24 January 1966, Air India Flight 101 Kanchenjunga, a Boeing 707-420 (registered VT-DMN) carrying 117 people (106 passengers and 11 crew) crashed on Mont Blanc, France killing all on board including the noted Indian scientist Homi J. Bhabha.
 On 1 January 1978, Air India Flight 855 Emperor Ashoka, a Boeing 747-200B (registered VT-EBD) crashed into the Arabian Sea after takeoff from Mumbai after the pilot became disorientated due to instrument failure, killing all 190 passengers and 23 crew on board.
 On 21 June 1982, Air India Flight 403 Gouri Shankar, a Boeing 707-420 (registered VT-DJJ) carrying 99 passengers and 12 crew from Kuala Lumpur to Bombay via Madras crashed while landing at Sahar International Airport during a rainstorm. The fuselage broke apart and seventeen people including two crew members were killed.
 On 23 June 1985, Air India Flight 182 Emperor Kanishka, a Boeing 747-200B (registered VT-EFO), was blown up in mid-air by a suitcase-bomb planted by Babbar Khalsa terrorists allegedly as revenge for the Indian Government's operation on the Golden Temple in June 1984. The flight was on the first leg on its Montreal-London-Delhi-Bombay flight when it exploded off the coast of Cork, Ireland in the Atlantic Ocean. All 307 passengers and 22 crew on board died.
 On 7 May 1990, Air India Flight 132 Emperor Vikramaditya, a Boeing 747-200B (registered VT-EBO) flying on the London-Delhi-Bombay route carrying 215 people (195 passengers and 20 crew) caught fire on touch down at Delhi airport due to a failure of an engine pylon-to-wing attachment. There were no fatalities but the aircraft was damaged beyond repair and written off.
 
 On 26 November 2022, Shankar Mishra, then an Indian vice-president for Wells Fargo, allegedly urinated on a female passenger and her seat in a business class of a New York JFK-Delhi Air India flight.  Mishra was then accused of exposing his genitalia until other passengers asked him to move. The female passenger was provided with clothes but had to continue to sit on the seat soaked with urine and was refused one of the empty seats in first class as a reparation. It was not until after the female passenger and her family filed a complaint that the airline took the issue to Indian law authorities. After the incident happened, Mishra fled to his hometown of Bengaluru to avoid the ultimate arrest, while he was barred from flying for 30 days with Air India. Mr. Mishra in January 2022 denied the allegation against him and instead alleged that the passenger had lost urinary continence and had urinated upon herself. The incident has been dubbed Pee-gate by the Indian media.

 On 6 December 2022, just a few days after the NYC-Delhi flight on which then-vice president of Wells Fargo Shankar Mishra allegedly urinated on a female passenger's seat, another Indian man, named Sukant Kumar, urinated on a female passenger’s blanket on a Paris-Delhi flight. The male passenger was apprehended by the Central Industrial Security Force, but was later released as the two passengers reached a "compromise".

See also

 Indians in the New York City metropolitan area
 List of airlines of India
 List of airports in India
 Transport in India

References

External links

 

 
Airlines of India
Indian brands
Tata Sons subsidiaries
Indian companies established in 1932
Airlines established in 1932
Formerly government-owned companies of India
Companies nationalised by the Government of India
Companies based in New Delhi
Star Alliance
Indian companies established in 1946